Veterinary immunology is the study of all aspects of immune system in animals. It is a branch under biomedical science and related to zoology and veterinary sciences.

The study include malfunctions and disorders, but also health, of the immune system in animals. It is the study in how the immune system works, how vaccines prevent disease and why vaccines sometimes do not work and cause adverse reactions.

Veterinary medicine